
Laguna Hedionda  (Spanish for "stinking lake") is a lake in the Potosí Department in Bolivia. At an elevation of 4532 m, its surface area is 3.2 km².

See also 
Laguna Hedionda (Nor Lípez) — a larger salt lake in Lípez Province.
Altiplano region
Mount Nelly

References 

Lakes of Potosí Department